The Tech Council of Maryland (TCM) is a technology trade association for companies with operations in Maryland, Washington, D.C. and Virginia. TCM has two divisions: The Tech Alliance, which serves the advanced technology industry, and MdBio, which serves the Maryland biotech industry.

Member Organizations

Notes

External links
Tech Council of Maryland Official Site

Notes

Technology trade associations
Organizations based in Maryland
Trade associations based in the United States